Francis DeMars (July 28, 1842 - September 24, 1904) was a member of the South Carolina House of Representatives in 1870 representing Orangeburg and a city official in Orangeburg.

He served in a regiment from New York during the American Civil War and settled in Orangeburg after the war.

References

External links

1842 births
1904 deaths